Idyash (İźäş) is a rural locality (a village) in Utyagulovsky Selsoviet, Zianchurinsky District, Bashkortostan, Russia. The population was 613 as of 2010. There are 5 streets.

Geography 
Idyash is located 70 km southeast of Isyangulovo (the district's administrative centre) by road. Utyagulovo is the nearest rural locality.

References 

Rural localities in Zianchurinsky District